The 2005 Laval municipal election took place on November 6, 2005, to elect a mayor and city councillors in Laval, Quebec.

Gilles Vaillancourt was elected to a fifth term as mayor, and his municipal party won every seat on city council. No other parties contested the election.

Results

Mayor

Council

Source: ÉLECTION MUNICIPALE DU 6 NOVEMBRE 2005, City of Laval.

References

2005 Quebec municipal elections
2005